Fate is the fifth album by Philadelphia indie rock band Dr. Dog. It was released on July 22, 2008. The album introduces some new studio elements to their established indie rock sound.

Background
Pre-orders from the album, depending on where it was pre-ordered, included signed CD art, a signed or unsigned 7" with two new songs ('The Dearly Departed' and 'Is It Worth My Time'), stickers, posters, t-shirts, and the album on vinyl.

The song "My Friend" was featured in trailers for the Judd Apatow film Funny People.

Album cover
The cover is a picture of a painting with the outlines sewn on done by Chicago native Ken Ellis. It was directly inspired by a picture of ill-fated outlaw duo Bonnie and Clyde. When the members of Dr. Dog saw the painting at Chicago's Rainbo Club, where Ellis bartended, they quickly bought it from him. They then used it as the album cover because they thought it fit with the general aesthetic of the album.

Track listing

Personnel 
Dr. Dog performed, recorded and wrote the songs and consists of:
Toby Leaman - vocals, bass, upright bass
Scott McMicken - vocals, lead guitar, piano
Frank McElroy - rhythm guitar, vocals
Zach Miller - keyboards, piano, guitar
Juston Stens - drums, percussion, vocals
Toby and Scott wrote the lyrics.
Dr. Dog composed the music.

Additional musicians consist of the following:
Danny Scofield - saxophones
Janka Perniss - violin
Tommy Bindle - percussion
Steve Duffy - trombone
Kimbal Brown - trumpet
John Pettit - trumpet
Heather Fortune - flute
Laura Foxx - clarinet
Victoria Baltimore - cello
Megan Smith - oboe
Eliza Jones - vocals

Additional production by:
Brendan Cooney - string and horn arrangements
Greg Calbi – mastering
Ken Ellis – paintings
Bill Moriarty – mixing
T. William Moriarty – production coordination
Kyle Pulley – production assistant, mixing assistant

References

2008 albums
Dr. Dog albums